Mohun is an Irish or Anglo-Norman surname.
People with this surname
Guy Mohun (died 1407), English royal administrator and bishop
Michael Mohun (1616?–1684), British actor
Richard Mohun (1865–1915), American explorer and soldier of fortune
William Mohun, English politician
Philippa de Mohun (died 1431), Duchess of York
William de Mohun of Dunster, 1st Earl of Somerset (c. 1090 – c. 1155), English lord
Baron Mohun a title in the English peerage created in 1299
John de Mohun, 2nd Baron Mohun (1320–1376)
Baron Mohun of Okehampton, a title in the English peerage created in 1628
John Mohun (1595–1641), the first Baron
Charles Mohun, 4th Baron Mohun (c. 1675 – 1712)

References